Telmatobius philippii is a species of frog in the family Telmatobiidae.
It is endemic to Chile.
Its natural habitat is rivers.

References

philippii
Amphibians of the Andes
Amphibians of Chile
Endemic fauna of Chile
Taxonomy articles created by Polbot
Amphibians described in 2002